Trimetozine (Opalene, Trimolide, Trioxazine) is a sedative that has been marketed in Europe since 1959. It also has mild tranquilizing effects and has been used in the treatment of anxiety. Its mechanism of action is unclear.

Conversion of the amide in trimetozine to the thioamide gives Tritiozine.

References 

Anxiolytics
4-Morpholinyl compunds
Phenol ethers